Yannik Jaeschke (born 20 October 1993) is a German professional footballer who plays as a centre-forward for TSV Havelse.

Career
Jaeschke made his professional debut for TSV Havelse in the 3. Liga on 24 July 2021 against 1. FC Saarbrücken.

References

External links
 
 
 
 

1993 births
Living people
People from Nienburg, Lower Saxony
Footballers from Lower Saxony
German footballers
Association football forwards
SV Werder Bremen II players
SV Rödinghausen players
TuS Erndtebrück players
TSV Havelse players
3. Liga players
Regionalliga players